Calephorini is a tribe of insects in the subfamily Acridinae, the silent slant-faced grasshoppers.

References

External links 
 

Acrididae
Orthoptera tribes